Foston is a small village and civil parish in the Ryedale district of North Yorkshire, England. The population of the civil parish as of the 2011 census was 263. Details are included in the civil parish of Whitwell-on-the-Hill.

History

The village is mentioned in the Domesday Book as "Fostun" in the Bulford hundred. At the time it was the possession of Earl Morcar, but had passed to Count Alan of Brittany by 1086. It was also recorded that there was a church here. The etymology of the name is from Old Scandinavian meaning "Fotr's settlement".

Governance

The village lies within the Thirsk and Malton UK Parliament constituency. It also lies within the Hovingham & Sheriff Hutton electoral division of North Yorkshire County Council and the Ryedale South West ward of Ryedale District Council.

Geography

According to the 1881 UK Census the population was 99. Local council estimates the current population as 50. The nearest settlements are Thornton-le-Clay  to the west; Bulmer, North Yorkshire  to the north; Whitwell-on-the-Hill  to the east and Barton Hill, North Yorkshire  to the south-east. To the east of the village is Spittal Beck, a tributary of the River Derwent.

The village is the site of a Scheduled monument, this being a medieval settlement and moated monastic grange. In addition to the church, the Rectory and Foston Hall are also Grade II listed buildings.

Religion

The presence of a church in the village was recorded at the time of the Norman invasion, but the present building, dedicated to All Saints, dates from the 12th century with subsequent renovations. It is a Grade II listed building.

Notable residents

The noted English writer and Anglican cleric, Sydney Smith, was rector of the parish from 1806 until 1829 and resident in the village from 1809.

References

External links

Villages in North Yorkshire
Civil parishes in North Yorkshire